Doubelievengod is the third album by Natas, released in 1995.

Music and lyrics 

Describing the music and lyrics, Allrovi called Doubelievengod "a much more mature album in terms of both production and rapping. Most obviously, the platter of samples is gone; for whatever reasons, the emphasis is now on synth-driven beats [...] The move toward eerie synth actually works in this album's favor, given its malevolent slant and ominous tone".

Reception 
Allrovi reviewer Jason Birchmeier writes that Doubelievengod "holds a special place in the Esham legacy alongside the Judgement Day albums as the summit of not necessarily his talent but rather his wickedness."

Track listing
All tracks produced by Esham

Sample credits
 "Doubelievengod" contains a sample of "Original Nuttah" as performed by UK Apachi
 "NATAS" contains a sample of "Original Nuttah" as performed by UK Apachi
 "Itzalright" contains a sample of "Black Frost" as performed by Grover Washington, Jr.
 "Can I R.I.P." contains a sample of "It Was a Good Day" as performed by Ice Cube
 "We Almost Lost Detroit" contains a sample of "We Almost Lost Detroit" by Gil Scott-Heron
 "Sunday School" contains a sample of "Groove With You" as performed by The Isley Brothers

References

1995 albums
Albums produced by Esham
Natas (group) albums
Reel Life Productions albums